Raw Run is recognized colloquially within the longboarding community as a recorded video showcasing the entire descent down a hill, from top to bottom. This is typically done all in one take to showcase the rider's consistency and skill.

Notable Examples 

Colorado native and longboarder, Zak Maytum, made national news when a video of him descending a roadway reportedly achieving 70 mph went viral. The YouTube video titled "Raw Run: Zak Maytum" reached one million views in under two days.

References

Sports terminology
Skateboarding